Lee Dong-gook (Hanja: 李同國 ; ; born 29 April 1979) is a South Korean former professional footballer who played as a striker. He is a record scorer in the K League 1, and had brief spells in Europe with Werder Bremen and Middlesbrough. He also played for the South Korea national football team at two FIFA World Cups and two AFC Asian Cups.

Club career

Pohang Steelers
In 1998, Lee joined a K League club Pohang Steelers and started his professional career instead of entering university. Lee was named the Rookie of the Year after scoring eleven goals for Pohang in his first K League season. He also helped Pohang win the Asian Club Championship in that year.

In January 2001, he was sent on loan to a Bundesliga club Werder Bremen, but he failed to settle in Bremen. He played only seven matches as a substitute during six months.

He scored six goals during seven league matches in early 2006 when his performance was at its height. In April 2006, however, he tore the cruciate ligaments in his knee while playing in a league match that forced him out for six months, and was unable to play in the 2006 FIFA World Cup.

Enlistment in Gwangju Sangmu
In 1998, Lee's father offered a bribe to an employee of the Military Manpower Administration in order to dodge Lee's military service. The conspiracy ended in smoke, and was revealed by the prosecutor's office in October 2001. Lee and his father were criticised for their conspiracy, but the court only ordered the monetary penalty of his father. Lee wasn't punished at all, and even got an opportunity to exempt from military service by participating in the 2002 Asian Games. However, he falied to won a gold medal in the Asian Games despite the special treatment, and had to perform his obligation. In March 2003, he joined the military team Gwangju Sangmu.

Middlesbrough
In January 2007, after being granted a work permit, Lee signed for Premier League club Middlesbrough on an 18-month contract. On 24 February 2007, he made his debut, coming on as an 85th minute substitute for Yakubu in the 2–1 win against Reading. On 29 August 2007, he scored his first goal against Northampton Town in the 2007–08 Football League Cup. On 26 January 2008, he scored his second goal against Mansfield Town in the 2007–08 FA Cup. However, he didn't score during 23 appearances in the Premier League and disappointed English fans. His contract expired at the end of the 2007–08 season and Middlesbrough decided not to extend his contract.

Jeonbuk Hyundai Motors
Lee signed a contract with Seongnam Ilhwa Chunma in 2008, but his difficult time was continued. He was transferred to Jeonbuk Hyundai Motors in the 2009 transfer window. In the 2009 K League, Lee became the top scorer by scoring 21 goals during 29 appearances, and Jeonbuk won their first-ever league trophy. He was named the Most Valuable Player after spending a successful season. In the 2011 K League, Lee recorded 16 goals and 15 assists during 29 appearances, leading Jeonbuk's second league title. He became the Most Valuable Player once again as well as the top assist provider. He also led Jeonbuk to the 2011 AFC Champions League Final after scoring nine goals until the semi-finals. Jeonbuk lost the final to Al Sadd after penalty shoot-out, but he was named the Most Valuable Player and the top scorer. On 3 March 2012, Lee became the K League's all-time leading scorer with 117 goals when he got two goals in the 2012 season opener against Seongnam Ilhwa Chunma.

In 2013, Lee was involved in a bizarre incident in a K League match against Seongnam FC. While attempting to return the ball to Seongnam's goalkeeper after an injury stoppage, he accidentally struck it past him from 40 yards to level the score at 1–1. Jeonbuk goalkeeper Choi Eun-sung then sportingly scored an own goal on purpose to restore Seongnam's lead.

Lee won his third and fourth MVP award after adding K League titles in 2014 and 2015. On 15 March 2016, Lee scored his 30th AFC Champions League goal against Becamex Binh Duong and became the AFC Champions League's all-time top scorer. On 26 November 2016, Lee and Jeonbuk won the 2016 AFC Champions League after defeating Al Ain in the final.

In the 2016 K League 1, Jeonbuk was deducted nine points for bribing two referees, and Korean fans protested that the punishment was too light. However, Lee ignored the corruption of his club, and didn't accept the result after losing the league title.

On 2 June 2019, he scored his 200th career goal at Jeonbuk Hyundai Motors in a match against Sangju Sangmu. On May 9 2020, Lee scored the only goal in a 1–0 win over Suwon Samsung Bluewings, which was notable for being the first league match in the world during the COVID-19 pandemic.

On 1 November 2020, Lee played virtually last game of his 23-year playing career, and got his retirement ceremony immediately after the game. This game, finished as a 2–0 victory over Daegu FC, was the last round of the 2020 K League 1, and Jeonbuk sealed their fourth successive title. On 8 November 2020, he played his last match as a substitute for eight minutes in the 2020 Korean FA Cup final, and got his last trophy.

International career
In the 1998 FIFA World Cup, Lee was a member of the South Korean national team, playing a match against the Netherlands as a substitute. After the World Cup, he led South Korea to the AFC Youth Championship title, becoming the tournament's MVP and top scorer.

Lee also took part in the 2000 AFC Asian Cup. He scored a hat-trick against Indonesia, bringing South Korea's only victory in the group stage. He scored a golden goal in extra time of the quarter-final match against Iran. He also scored a goal in the semi-finals against Saudi Arabia, but South Korea lost this time. He became a top goalscorer with six goals after scoring the winning goal in the third place match against China.

In 2002, Lee was not chosen by Guus Hiddink to represent South Korea in 2002 FIFA World Cup. Fans called him "Lazy Genius", because they felt that he did not fully use his potential. This is also because Hiddink emphasized strong stamina, great power, and agile speed, which are the categories that Lee struggles in, except power. He later admitted that he spent his days drinking and did not watch a single game that took place during the 2002 World Cup.

Lee was coach Dick Advocaat's first-choice selection at forward for Korea ahead of the 2006 FIFA World Cup, but a knee injury suffered in a K League match forced him to miss the tournament. On 1 November 2007, Lee was banned from the national team for twelve months after it was revealed that he, along with team captain Lee Woon-jae, teammates Kim Sang-sik and Woo Sung-yong, went on a late night drinking spree with several female employees during the 2007 AFC Asian Cup, in which Korea received third place. Unlike the other members who were involved in this incident, because Lee played for Middlesbrough in England, the KFA could not ban him from his club team matches.

Lee was selected as a reserve striker of the national team for the 2010 FIFA World Cup. He came on as a substitute in the round of 16 against Uruguay, and got a crucial chance made by Park Ji-sung. However, his shot lacked the power to cross the goal line, and South Korea lost the game after his mistake. He was denounced by South Korean fans, and was worried that his family would get hurt due to the criticisms about him.

Lee played in qualifiers for 2014 and 2018 FIFA World Cup but was not listed on the final teams for the tournaments.

Personal life
Lee married Lee Soo-jin, a runner up of Miss Korea 1997, in December 2005. The couple have five children: twin daughters Lee Jae-si and Lee Jae-ah (born 14 August 2007), twin daughters Lee Seol-ah and Lee Soo-ah (born 18 July 2013) and son Lee Si-an, nicknamed Daebak (born 14 November 2014).

Lee, along with his five children, has appeared on the Sunday variety show The Return of Superman (aired on KBS World TV) from 2015 to 2019. The Return of Superman shows famous Korean fathers taking care of their children for 48 hours without their wife. Lee is the first on the show to have five children to take care of.

On December 23, 2022, Lee signed with Think Entertainment.

Career statistics

Club

International

Scores and results list South Korea's goal tally first, score column indicates score after each Lee goal.

Filmography

Television

Honours

Player
Pohang Steelers
Asian Club Championship: 1997–98
Korean FA Cup runner-up: 2001, 2002

Jeonbuk Hyundai Motors
K League 1: 2009, 2011, 2014, 2015, 2017, 2018, 2019, 2020, 2021
Korean FA Cup: 2020
AFC Champions League: 2016

South Korea U20
AFC Youth Championship: 1998

South Korea U23
Asian Games bronze medal: 2002

South Korea
AFC Asian Cup third place: 2000, 2007
EAFF Championship runner-up: 2010

Individual
AFC Youth Championship Most Valuable Player: 1998
AFC Youth Championship top goalscorer: 1998
K League All-Star Game Most Valuable Player: 1998, 2001, 2003, 2012
K League Rookie of the Year: 1998
AFC Asian Cup top goalscorer: 2000
AFC Asian Cup Team of the Tournament: 2000
AFC Asian All Stars: 2000
Korean FA Goal of the Year: 2004
K League 1 top goalscorer: 2009
K League 1 Most Valuable Player: 2009, 2011, 2014, 2015
K League FANtastic Player: 2009, 2011, 2014, 2015
K League 1 Best XI: 2009, 2011, 2012, 2014, 2015
EAFF Championship top goalscorer: 2010
K League 1 top assist provider: 2011
AFC Champions League top goalscorer: 2011
AFC Champions League Most Valuable Player: 2011
K League Hall of Fame: 2023

Entertainer

See also
 List of men's footballers with 100 or more international caps

References

External links
 
 Lee Dong-gook – National Team Stats at KFA 
 
 

1979 births
Living people
People from Pohang
South Korean footballers
Association football forwards
South Korea international footballers
1998 FIFA World Cup players
2000 AFC Asian Cup players
2000 CONCACAF Gold Cup players
2002 CONCACAF Gold Cup players
2004 AFC Asian Cup players
2007 AFC Asian Cup players
2010 FIFA World Cup players
Asian Games medalists in football
Footballers at the 1998 Asian Games
Footballers at the 2002 Asian Games
Asian Games bronze medalists for South Korea
Medalists at the 2002 Asian Games
Footballers at the 2000 Summer Olympics
FIFA Century Club
Pohang Steelers players
SV Werder Bremen players
Gimcheon Sangmu FC players
Middlesbrough F.C. players
Seongnam FC players
Jeonbuk Hyundai Motors players
K League 1 Most Valuable Player Award winners
K League 1 players
Bundesliga players
Premier League players
South Korean expatriate footballers
Olympic footballers of South Korea
South Korean expatriate sportspeople in Germany
Expatriate footballers in Germany
South Korean expatriate sportspeople in England
Expatriate footballers in England
Sportspeople from North Gyeongsang Province